"Paris (Ooh La La)" is the second single from Grace Potter and the Nocturnals' eponymous  third studio album.

Personnel
Adapted credits from the booklet. 
Grace Potter – lead vocals, electric guitar
Scott Tournet – lead guitar
Benny Yurco – rhythm guitar
Catherine Popper – bass guitar
Matt Burr – drums
Mary Broome – Lyrics (French)

Covers
Brian Fuente, a contestant on the second season of the U.S version of The Voice, covered the song in his blind audition.
Ashley De La Rosa, another contestant on the second season of the U.S version of The Voice, covered the song for her last chance performance.
Jennel Garcia, a contestant on the second season of the U.S. version of The X Factor, covered the song in her audition.
Amanda Brown a contestant on the third season of the U.S. version of The Voice, covered the song during the knockout rounds.
Pamela Anderson danced to this song in the 15th season of Dancing with the Stars.
Fatin Shidqia, a contestant on the first season of the Indonesian version of The X Factor, covered the song in her bootcamp.
Emily Piriz, a contestant on the thirteenth season of American Idol, covered this song during "Rush Week," a round featuring the top 20 contestants of the season. The song was well received by the judges, but Harry Connick Jr. raised some concerns as to whether or not she wanted to perform rather racy songs in the future.
 Kat Perkins, a contestant on the sixth season of the U.S. version of The Voice, covered the song as her Instant Save song during the second week of the live shows.
Allie Keck, a contestant on the twenty-third season of the U.S version of The Voice, covered the song in her blind audition.

In popular culture
"Paris (Ooh La La)" and "That Phone", another track from the Grace Potter and the Nocturnals album, were used in the CW show Hart of Dixie (2011).
"Paris (Ooh La La)" and "Hot Summer Night", another track from the Grace Potter and the Nocturnals album, were used in an episode of MTV hit TV show "Awkward" (2011).
"Paris (Ooh La La)" was used in a Rizzoli & Isles commercial.

References

2010 singles
Grace Potter and the Nocturnals songs
Hollywood Records singles
2010 songs
Song recordings produced by Mark Batson